The fifth season of the sitcom Mom began airing on November 2, 2017, and concluded on May 10, 2018 on CBS in the United States. The season is produced by Chuck Lorre Productions and Warner Bros. Television, with series creators Chuck Lorre, Eddie Gorodetsky and Gemma Baker serving as executive producer. 

Christy (Anna Faris) has gone back to school and is pursuing her dream of becoming a lawyer, while Bonnie (Allison Janney) attempts to have a healthy romantic relationship with her fiancé, Adam (William Fichtner). Through it all, Christy and Bonnie rely on their support system from AA, including the wise Marjorie (Mimi Kennedy), the wealthy and sometimes misguided Jill (Jaime Pressly), and the overly emotional Wendy (Beth Hall). Collectively, they help each other stay sober in the face of whatever life throws at them. The episodes are usually titled with two odd topics that are mentioned in that episode.

Jaime Pressly was absent from a few episodes due to her maternity leave.

Season five of Mom aired Thursdays in the United States at 9:00 p.m. after Young Sheldon.

Cast

Main
 Anna Faris as Christy Plunkett
 Allison Janney as Bonnie Plunkett
 Mimi Kennedy as Marjorie Armstrong-Perugian
 Jaime Pressly as Jill Kendall
 Beth Hall as Wendy Harris
 William Fichtner as Adam Janikowski

Recurring
 Steven Weber as Patrick Janikowski
 Missi Pyle as Natasha
 Yvette Nicole Brown as Nora Rogers
 Amy Hill as Beverly Tarantino
 Charlie Robinson as Mr. Munson
 Julia Lester as Emily
 Leonard Roberts as Ray Stabler
 Matt Jones as Baxter
 French Stewart as Chef Rudy
 Lauri Johnson as Beatrice
 Reggie De Leon as Paul
 Mary Pat Gleason as Mary

Special guest stars
 Kristin Chenoweth as Miranda
 Kristen Johnston as Tammy Diffendorf
 Patti LuPone as Rita Gennaro

Guest stars
 Michael Angarano as Cooper
 Beth Littleford as Lorraine
 Danielle Bisutti as Dana
 Patricia Belcher as Gloria
 Matt Oberg as Geoffrey
 Ryan Malgarini as Brendan
 Kevin Fonteyne as Danny
 Lela Lee as Alice
 Terri Hoyos as Soledad
 Jazmyn Simon as Vanessa
 Mary Faber as Marla
 Jared Gretner as Peter
 Bill Fagerbakke as Sergeant Reubenzer
 Max Adler as Officer Blankenship
 George Paez as Ramone

Episodes

Ratings

References

Mom (TV series)
2017 American television seasons
2018 American television seasons